The MS Viking I was a roll-on roll-off (RORO) car and passenger ferry and was last owned by Ionian Sky Ferry before being scrapped in 2008. She was originally commissioned by Otto Thoresen of Thoresen Ferries for service between Southampton and Cherbourg across the English Channel.

Revolutionary design
Viking I was designed by naval architect Tage Wandborg in the early 1960s. She was a drive-through car ferry and was a significant and revolutionary design, being one of the first of her kind to operate from the UK across the Western English channel. Viking I was in operation on the Southampton to Cherbourg and Le Havre routes from 1964 for Otto Thoresen's Thoresen Ferries.

References 

1964 ships
Ships built in Tønsberg
Ferries